Nude Men is the 1993 debut novel by American writer Amanda Filipacchi. At age twenty-two, she wrote it as her thesis for Columbia University's graduate creative writing program. It was published by Viking in hardback and by Penguin in paperback, and was translated into 13 languages, including French, Turkish, and Hebrew. The Chicago Tribune wrote that it was "reminiscent of some of Philip Roth's zanier explorations of identity and sexuality." Kirkus Reviews noted that it "combines the techniques of Thomas McGuane with bits of Lolita and The Picture of Dorian Gray."

Plot summary
Nude Men is about a twenty-nine-year-old man who is sexually pursued by a "precocious 11-year-old... who makes Lolita look like a Girl Scout."

The novel explores the man's horror at his own attraction, and recounts his efforts at resisting her persistent advances.

References 

Novels by Amanda Filipacchi
1993 American novels
Absurdist fiction
American satirical novels
American magic realism novels
1993 debut novels